Pang Ung, also spelled  Pang Oung, is a tourist attraction in northern Thailand. 

Located in Mueang Mae Hong Son District, Mae Hong Son province. It is a project of H.M. King Bhumibol Adulyadej (Rama IX), the King wishes to restore the forests and ecosystems around the Patong and Fang Pang Ung reservoirs. Because in the past, this place has been encroaching on the area for deforestation for a long time.

Pang Ung is a reservoir or lake that has a cold climate all year round, thus making it dubbed as "the Switzerland of Thailand". In addition, it is said to be a beautiful and romantic place like Namiseom, a location in K-dramas. It has become popular, especially for young tourists.

Pang Ung is officially named "Pang Tong Royal Project Development II (Pang Ung)", which is a different place to Pang Ung Royal Project Development in neighbouring province Chiang Mai.

Its name Pang means "the lodging of the lumberjacks" and Ung is northern language refers to "lowland like a large basin with a lot of waterlogged" probably referring to the accommodation edge the reservoir.

Pang Ung has the area large reservoir on the high hill and is lined with pine trees. Numerous camping sites were visible as well as small cottages nestled in the sloping ground surrounding the reservoir. The tourists can have the tent has both bring their own tents or rental.

It is open from 5.30 am until 6.00 pm daily. The best time to visit is winter (November–December).

See more
Royal Project Foundation

References

Tourist attractions in Mae Hong Son province
Geography of Mae Hong Son province
Lakes of Thailand